Jasmin Khezri (born 1 June 1967 in London)  is a German-Iranian artist, designer, illustrator and writer.

Life and work 
Jasmin Khezri studied graphic design at Parsons The New School for Design in Paris and Los Angeles.  After her studies she worked for the SZ-Magazine of Süddeutsche Zeitung in Munich and in 1993 became art director of the SZ youth magazine Jetzt. She created its innovative design, which won numerous awards. In 1998 she became art director of the German magazine Marie Claire and in 2000 Creative Director of the fashion company Peek & Cloppenburg.

From 2002 she started to illustrate and write under the nom de plume IRMA. As IRMA she gives fashion, lifestyle and beauty advice in women's and lifestyle magazines in Germany, Great Britain, France, the US and Japan. Her illustrations are regularly published in international magazines like Tatler, Elle, Marie Claire, Cosmopolitan, Vogue and Glamour.

Awards 
 Visual Lead Award 1996 of the magazine Horizont for the design and concept of the youth magazine Jetzt
 Förderpreis Angewandte Kunst der Landeshauptstadt München, 1996

Exhibitions 
 City Hall, Munich, 1997
 La Samaritaine, Paris, 2001
 Art of Taste, New York, 2003
 „Art Meets Fashion“, Praterinsel, Munich, 2009
 Isetan Gallery, Tokyo, 2010
 Seven Elohim Gallery, Munich, 2018

References

External links 
 IRMA'S World: www.irmasworld.com
 IRMA on Glamour: http://www.glamour.de/artikel-nach-tag/Irmas%2BTipp/0/
 IRMA in ICON - Magazin of Welt am Sonntag: https://www.welt.de/icon/article152333316/IRMA-goes-ICON.html

1967 births
Living people
German people of Iranian descent
German graphic designers
Women graphic designers
German illustrators
German women journalists
Parsons School of Design alumni
Artists from London
Journalists from London
20th-century German artists
20th-century journalists
20th-century German women artists
21st-century German artists
21st-century journalists
21st-century German women artists
20th-century German women writers
20th-century German writers
21st-century German women writers